Serinyol is a town in the central district (Antakya) of Hatay Province, Turkey.

Geography 

Serinyol is a town in the central district (Antakya) of Hatay Province. It is situated to the east of Nur Mountains which lie between the Mediterranean Sea and Amik Valley on  Turkish state highway . The population of Serinyol was 14,751  as of 2012.

History 

The settlement was founded in the 19th century by Circassian refugees from Russia. Between 1918 and 1938 it was under French  occupation. On 7 September it became a part of Hatay Republic and on 7 July 1939 Hatay Republic was merged to Turkey.

Economy 

Olive, cotton, citrus and vegetables consist the agricultural wealth of Serinyol. There are also some light agriculture based industries  in Serinyol.

References

Populated places in Hatay Province
Towns in Turkey
Antakya District